Events from the year 1564 in India.

Events
 3 September – António de Noronha becomes viceroy of India (until 1568)

Births
 4 June – Ahmad Sirhindi, Indian Islamic scholar, (died 1624)

Deaths
 24 June – Rani Durgavati (born 1524).
 Rupa Goswami, devotional teacher and poet (born 1489).

References

See also
 Timeline of Indian history